Sarshiv District is a district (bakhsh) in Saqqez County, Kurdistan Province, Iran. At the 2006 census, its population was 10,339, in 1,965 families.  The District has no cities. The District has two rural districts (dehestan): Chehel Cheshmeh-ye Gharbi Rural District and Zu ol Faqr Rural District.

References 

Saqqez County
Districts of Kurdistan Province